Patrick Leonard Carey (born 1960) is a Canadian baritone and tenor saxophonist, clarinetist, vocalist and is best known for his longstanding association with the Downchild Blues Band.

Early life 
Pat Carey, originally from The Pas, Manitoba, was born into a musical family. At the age of six he began his early musical learning studying the piano, which lead him to start learning the saxophone by age thirteen. He earned a degree in music, with a Major in Performance from the University of Manitobafrom 1977 to 1982. Carey during those years went on to perform with the Winnipeg Symphony Orchestra sharing the stage with many of the visiting jazz greats.

Music career

Early career: 1982–1990s Studio musician to Downchild
In 1979, Carey partnered with Tom Jestadt, noted Canadian drummer and formed the Pat Carey and Tom Jestadt Jazz Quartet. Carey then joined Rocki Rolletti, the group went on to win the TransCanada Rock Contest in 1982 which secured them a recording session with producer Bob Ezrin. Working for many years as a studio musician, Carey made several recordings for CBC TV, CBC RADIO, CKY TV and CKND TV. While still a member of the Rocki Rolletti, he opened for the Reunion of The Guess Who. Carey found himself being featured on numerous jingles, radio and TV shows for CBC, CTV and Global Television. In 1984 Carey moved to Toronto, Ontario where he has continued as a working musician and music educator. In 1984 he performed with George Olliver and the Gang Buster, Tony Flaim and with Hock Walsh of Downchild.  From 1984 - 1989, he was the Entertainment Director for Madame’s Restaurant in Toronto. In 1985 Carey joined the Downchild Blues Band and has continued to play and record with the band since that time, in addition to contributing to the work of other musicians. While with Downchild, Carey remained a member of the Labatt Double Blues Band from 1986 until 1989. Then with the elite of what Carey considered to be the prime pick of musical talent, he fulfilled his dream of sharing his musical skills in the forming and leading of his own band, the Jazz Navigators.

1990s–Early 2000s Awards 
Carey is a multiple Maple Blues Award winner, as horn player of the year and a multiple Juno Award winner. His distinguished musical career was so honoured by the Juno Awards as early as 1992 and with the Maple Blues Award beginning in 1999. Carey has remained a member of The Maple Blues Revue, which was formed by both Carey and Gary Kendall. This eleven member group of Canadian blues musicians whom are all multiple Maple Blues Award winners or nominees, perform at the annual Maple Blues Awards Ceremony in Toronto, Ontario as the Maple Blues Band and have released one recording, Live at Twisted Pines.

2000s–Jazz Navigators to Producer
Over the years, Carey has been an integral part of many Canadian recordings, he co-produced three of Downchild's CD's, with Come On In being nominated in 2004 for a Juno Award. Carey and the Jazz Navigators recorded their first CD Starlight in 2002, in 2007 followed the release of their second CD South By Southeast and in 2008 they released Jumpin in Jersey. In addition to his recordings, Carey has performed with Sarah Vaughan, Tony Bennett, Mel Torme, Buddy Guy, Sam Moore, Little Anthony, The Drifters, Tommy Roe, Ron Hynes, Powder Blues Band, Dan Aykroyd, Junior Watson, Steamboat Willie, Lesley Gore, Colin James, Lionel Hampton just to name a few, as well as in Israel and Cypress for the Canadian Armed Forces and toured in Europe, North America and Scandinavia. Carey has recorded with Downchild, Gary Kendall Band, Maple Blues Revue, Kenny 'Blues Boss' Wayne, Rita Chiarelli, Raoul and The Big Time, Heidi Lange, Ray Edge, Fathead, New Millennium Orchestra, amongst others. When not performing with Downchild, Carey continues to perform with local bands, the Hogtown All Stars, Lou Pinto, Maple Blues Revue, Raoul and the Big Time, Sophia Perlman and the Vipers, Chuck Jackson's Allstars and Bradley and the Bouncers.

The documentary 
In 2012, Carey was involved in a live concert documentary that was produced outlining the 40-year career of the Downchild Blues Band. Through their musical legacy Downchild, had a huge impact on Canadian and American culture, influencing a new generation of young musicians including Colin James, Jeff Healey and many more to continue the blues tradition in Canada. Downchild was the inspiration for actor Dan Aykroyd’s Blues Brothers phenomenon.

Musical styles and legacy 
A diverse group of Canadian musicians and business people formed the Iridescent Music Company, in 2002, which Carey became the President and Director of Music Production and Promotion Jazz and Blues. Sharing his musical skills, with this new company his next project is an all-original Jazz CD featuring many of the greatest Canadian Jazz musicians.

Awards and recognition 
Q107 Toronto Music Awards
1989 Best Toronto Blues Group – Downchild

Jazz Report Award
1998 Blues Group of The Year – Downchild

Juno Award
1992 Best Roots or Traditional Album - Saturday Night Blues - Downchild (Various Artists)
2006 Blues Album of the Year - Let it Loose - Kenny "Blues Boss" Wayne
2014 Blues Album of the Year - Can You Hear The Music - Downchild

Maple Blues Award
1999 Horn Player of The Year
2000 Horn Player of the Year
2001 Horn Player of the Year
2002 Horn Player of the Year
2004 Horn Player of the Year
2005 Recording of the Year - Come on In - Downchild
2005 Electric Act of the Year - Downchild
2005 Entertainer of the Year - Downchild
2006 Entertainer of the Year - Downchild
2007 Horn Player of the Year
2008 Horn Player of the Year

Discography

With Downchild Blues Band
Studio albums
1987: Its Been So Long/Ready To Go
1989: Gone Fishing
1994: Good Times Guaranteed
1997: Lucky 13 
2003: Body of Work
2004: Come On In
2007: Live at the Palais Royale (Co-producer)
2009: I Need A Hat (Co-producer)
2012: Toronto Blues Now
2013: Can Your Hear The Music (Co-producer)

Compilations
1998: A Case of The Blues: The Best of Downchild Blues Band
2000: A Matter of Time - The Downchild Collection
2003: Body of Work - The Downchild Collection Volume 2

With The Jazz Navigators
2002: Starlight
2007: South by Southeast
2008: Jumpin In Jersey

With Rita Chiarelli
1994: Just Getting Started
2004: No-One To Blame

With Chuck Jackson's Big Bad Blues Band
1999: A Cup of Joe
2012: True North Essentials

With Chuck Jackson & The Allstars
1999: Significant Sundays Series - Vol.1
2006: Comfy Cosy

With Gary Kendall
2004: Dusty and Pearl 
2008: Feels Real Strong

Maple Blues Revue
2009: Live at Twisted Pines

Raoul and The Big Time
2009: You My People
2014: Hollywood Blvd

With Other Artists
1992: Canadian Blues Masters
1994: Sunburst - Joe Mavety
1995: 10th Anniversary Sampler - Blue Wave
1995: Toronto Blues Society - Toronto Blues Society
1995: Part.1 Moksha - New Millennium Orchestra
1996: 20 Years of Stoney Plain - Stoney Plain
1996: Bin So Long - Mark Burkholder With Little Wingz
1997: Penny For Your Thoughts - Kelly Gale 
1999: Legends Of The Blues Vol. 1 - Famous Dave’s
1999: Down in the Groove - Jack de Keyzer
2000: Let’s Return To Love - The Unity Band
2000: Topless - Big Daddy G
2000: Righteous - Danny Brooks
2000:  Amore - Ginny Lynn
2000: 15th Anniversary Sampler - Blue Wave
2000: Where's Your Head At? - Fathead
2000: Mr. Rock N' Soul - Curley Bridges
2000: Guitar Romp - Brian Gauci 
2001: My Kind of Blues - Sunny Fournier
2002: An Electro-Fi Christmas Blues Collection - Santa’s Got Mojo
2003: Harpspace - Mark Stafford
2003: At Least I Had A Life - Doug Peart Blues Machine
2004: Tell Mama - Heather Katz
2004: Corporate Slave - Coldsweat
2004: Take Me - Maria Aurigema
2004: A Little Bit of Sugar - Angela Scappatura
2004: Coming From The Old School - Sam Myers
2005: Soul Connection - Ray Edge
2005: Try To See Me Like That - Elyssa Mahoney
2005: The Doug Peart Blues Machine - The Doug Peart Blues Machine
2006: Got To Get Over You - L’il Dave Thompson
2006: Musical Poetry Volume 2 - Phil Ball
2006: Bonestown Awful - Bradley and The Bouncers
2006: Steppin’ Out Of Blue Monday - Jimmy Cavallo, Pat Carey, Johnny Pennino
2006: Zwigg Fusion - Rob Zwicker
2006: Something So Right - Chris Kenny
2007: Once Smitten - Sophia Perlman and The Vipers
2007: Blue Sneakers - Steve Grisbrook
2008: Brand New Lonesome - Joanne Mackell
2009: Later -Heidi Lange
2010: Stealing Genius - Ron Hynes
2011: Bluebird Motel - Rob Young 
2011: The Vipers
2012: Ballroom Stars Vol. 4 - Pat Carey and Jimmy Cavallo
2012: Live Jake at The Drake - Big Rude Jake and The Jump City Crusaders 
2013: Highway 69 - The Burgess Brothers
2014: Musical Poetry Volume 3 - Hip Hip Hourray/Phil Ball
2014: Hollywood Blvd - Raoul and The Big Time
2015: The Soul Station Vol. 2: The Songs of Curtis Mayfield: A Tribute - Jarvis Church
2015: Leighton Life - Tom Leighton
2016: Devestatin' Rhythm - David Vest
2016: Blues Country - Diana Braithwaite and Chris Whiteley

Citations

External links
Pat Carey Website
Pat Carey Iridescent Music
Pat Carey credits at AllMusic

Canadian jazz saxophonists
Male saxophonists
Canadian clarinetists
Canadian jazz musicians
Canadian blues musicians
University of Manitoba alumni
Musicians from Manitoba
People from The Pas
Living people
1960 births
21st-century saxophonists
21st-century clarinetists
21st-century Canadian male musicians
Canadian male jazz musicians